Hit for Six is the first full-length studio album by the English punk rock band Consumed. It was released in November 1999 on the American independent label Fat Wreck Chords.

Critical reception
Exclaim! wrote: "England's cricket-loving answer to Pennywise follow up their debut EP, Breakfast at Poppa's, with 14 heavy-hitting and oh-so melodic SoCal-inspired punk anthems."

AllMusic called the album "a searing swarm of hardcore guitars and drums" and "explosive metal-tinged punk."

Track listing 
All tracks written by Consumed
"Sunny Side Up" – 2:29  
"On the Take Again" – 2:01  
"Wake Up With a Smile" – 2:45  
"King Kong Song" – 3:08
"Nicky Fry" – 1:51  
"Something to Do" – 1:50  
"Lead the Way" – 2:23  
"Twat Called Maurice" – 2:40  
"Butterside Down" – 2:29 
"Do the Duchess" – 2:26  
"Chop Suicide" – 2:33  
"Promoter Head" – 1:49  
"Black and Blue" – 2:57  
"Start Living" – 2:30

Credits 
 Steve Ford – guitar, vocals
 Mike Ford – guitar, vocals
 Baz Barrett – bass guitar
 Chris Billam – drums
 Produced and engineered by Andy Sneap

References

External links 
 Fat Wreck Chords album page

Consumed (band) albums
1999 debut albums
Fat Wreck Chords albums
Albums produced by Andy Sneap